Carlo Nordio (born 6 February 1947) is an Italian politician, former magistrate and prosecutor, who is serving as Italian Minister of Justice since 22 October 2022, in Giorgia Meloni's government. In the 2022 Italian presidential election he was the candidate of Brothers of Italy for President of Italy. In the 2022 Italian general election he was elected to the Chamber of Deputies.

Professional career
Nordio was born in Treviso, in the Veneto region, in 1947. He became a magistrate in 1977, and was later appointed deputy prosecutor of Venice. In the 1980s, he led investigations on the Venetian Red Brigades. In the early 1990s, Nordio was among the protagonists of the famous Mani Pulite investigation.

During his later career, he was a consultant to the Parliamentary Commission for Terrorism and chairman of the Ministerial Commission for the reform of the penal code. Nordio served as deputy prosecutor of Venice until his retirement in 2017, dealing with economic crimes, corruption and medical liability. After his retirement, he collaborated with numerous legal journals and newspapers including Il Tempo, Il Messaggero, and Il Gazzettino. Since 5 December 2018, he has been a member of the board of directors of the Luigi Einaudi Onlus Foundation.

Political career

On 24 January 2022, Brothers of Italy's leader Giorgia Meloni proposed Nordio as her candidate in the 2022 Italian presidential election. Nordio rejected the candidacy, citing lack of political experience. However, he was confirmed as a possible candidate of the centre-right coalition on the following day. On 29 January, Brothers of Italy voted him when all the other main parties proposed a re-election of incumbent president Sergio Mattarella.

On the occasion of the 2022 referendum on justice, he promoted the reasons for the yes, joining, as one of its major exponents, the Committee for the yes.

In the early political elections of 25 September 2022 he was a candidate for the Chamber of Deputies in the single-member constituency of Treviso for the center-right and as the leader of the Brothers of Italy in the multi-member Veneto. Nordio was elected in the uninominal with 56.2%.

On 22 October 2022, Nordio was appointed Minister of Justice in the government led by Giorgia Meloni, who became the first woman to serve as Prime Minister of Italy.

Political positions
Nordio considers himself a conservative liberal, a pro-Europeanist and an
Atlanticist, while having an admiration for Winston Churchill. In 1967 he joined the Italian Liberal Party, but he had to leave the party upon becoming a magistrate. After retiring, he joined the new Italian Liberal Party, of which he was a member of the committee of the guarantors until 2022.

Electoral history

References

External links

1947 births
Living people
People from Treviso
Italian magistrates
Italian prosecutors
Candidates for President of Italy
University of Padua alumni
20th-century Italian lawyers
21st-century Italian lawyers
Deputies of Legislature XIX of Italy
Italian Ministers of Justice
Meloni Cabinet